Thursday FC was an Australian sports variety television program which covered professional association football in Australia. It was shown on SBS2 and presented by Lucy Zelic and former footballer David Zdrilic.

The TV series ceased in February 2014 after poor audience ratings. South Park replaced it after it was axed.

The format was loose and based on the BBC's Top-Gear style presentation format. Innovative use of graphics, social media and live music made the program stand out from the usual sport themed programs available to Australian audiences. Graphics used by the producers were in a comic book style and made the show visually memorable.

The show aired on Thursday nights, the first episode premiered on 10 October 2013 ahead of the first game of the 2013–14 A-League season. The program showcased the latest football news, views and opinions with a predominant focus on the A-League, the hour-long show was packed with entertainment, interviews and live performances. Each episode included a look at each upcoming A-League game for the round, highlights from the previous weekend of football as well as special guests including players, celebrity tipping and live music acts.

Presenters
Lucy Zelic (2013–2014)
David Zdrilic (2013–2014)
Matt Okine (2013–2014)

Scheduling
The show aired once weekly on Thursday nights at 8:30 PM. It can also be viewed online and on many televisions with Smart capabilities through SBS on Demand.

See also

List of Australian television series

References

External links
 

Soccer in Australia
Special Broadcasting Service original programming
SBS Sport
Australian sports television series
A-League Men on television
2013 Australian television series debuts
2014 Australian television series endings
English-language television shows
Soccer mass media in Australia